Nasty, Live & Funky is a live album released by the funk/R&B group Cameo in 2007. In addition to the live material, two studio tracks were included: "Come Fly With Me", and "Nasty", both written by Larry Blackmon. The "Mega-Mix" is a remix of the album's live tracks. This album is a track for track re-release of Nasty from 1996, but with a new album title and cover.

Track listing
 "Intro" – 1:03
 "Flirt" – 1:36 - Blackmon, Jenkins
 "She's Strange" – 2:37 - Blackmon, Jenkins, Leftenant, Singleton
 "Back and Forth" – 5:54 - Blackmon, Jenkins, Kendrick, Leftenant
 "Skin I'm In" – 5:09 - Blackmon  	  
 "Why Have I Lost You" – 6:10 - Blackmon  	  
 "Sparkle" – 4:23 - Blackmon, Lockett
 "Candy" – 4:45 - Blackmon, Jenkins
 "Shake Your Pants" (Intro) – 0:42
 "Shake Your Pants" – 4:00 - Blackmon
 "I Just Want to Be" – 1:38 - Blackmon, Johnson
 "Keep It Hot" – 5:12 - Blackmon, Lockett
 "Word Up!" – 6:44 - Blackmon, Jenkins
 "Come Fly With Me" – 3:57 - Blackmon
 "Nasty" – 3:44 - Blackmon
 "Megamix" – 6:29 - Cameo

References

Cameo (band) albums
2007 live albums